DeAndrea is a surname and given name. Notable people with the surname or given name include:

Surname
William L. DeAndrea (1952-1996), American mystery writer and columnist

Given name
DeAndrea G. Benjamin (born 1972), American lawyer and judge
DeAndrea Salvador, American politician

See also
D'Andrea